John Shepard Reed is the former chairman of the New York Stock Exchange.  He previously served as chairman and CEO of Citicorp, Citibank, and post-merger, Citigroup. He is the past chairman of the Massachusetts Institute of Technology's board of trustees.

Biography
He was born in Chicago, Illinois, and raised in Argentina and Brazil.  Reed earned his undergraduate degrees in a 3-2 program from Washington and Jefferson College (W&J) and Massachusetts Institute of Technology (MIT), earning a B.S. from the MIT Sloan School of Management in 1961.  He was also a member of Lambda Chi Alpha fraternity while at W&J and MIT. He served two years in the U.S. Army before returning to get his master's degree in management from the MIT Sloan School of Management in 1965.

Reed was heavily responsible for pushing for the adoption of the ATM around the US, and led Citicorp through a perilous period in the early 1990s. He was approached by Sandy Weill to merge with Travelers Group a year before the Gramm-Leach-Bliley Act of 1999 (repealing the Glass–Steagall Act of 1933), allowing banking, insurance and securities companies to merge. The result was Citigroup, where Reed was later ousted in a management shakeup with Weill. Reed's departure was announced in a 28 February 2000 press release. In the aftermath of the November 2008 federal bailout of Citigroup, Reed was described as deeply skeptical of the "Wall Street financial engineering" that led to its collapse and "committed to consumer banking and sound commercial underwriting."

Reed was asked to be interim CEO of the New York Stock Exchange after the Richard Grasso over-compensation scandal.  He accepted the job for a $1 salary and set up new governance rules as the NYSE became a public corporation.

Reed was a member of both the American Academy of Arts and Sciences and the American Philosophical Society.

Reed was the chairman of the Massachusetts Institute of Technology's Corporation (board of trustees) from 2010 through 2014.

He was a longtime member of the board of directors of Altria Group (and predecessor Phillip Morris Companies) through his retirement in 2008.

He became member of the Board of Directors of CaixaBank in 2011.

Parents are Calvin Francis Reed and Virginia Shepard Reed of Toledo, Ohio .

References

Further reading
Augier, Mie. Making Management Matter: An Interview With John Reed. Academy of Management Learning & Education, 2006, Vol. 5, No. 1, 84-100.
"Citigroup Announces the Retirement of John S. Reed Chairman and Co-Chief Executive", Citigroup news release, 28 February 2000 (archived 2008)

External links
Testimony before Senate Banking Committee

1939 births
Living people
American chief executives of financial services companies
MIT Sloan School of Management alumni
Businesspeople from Chicago
New York Stock Exchange people
Washington & Jefferson College alumni
Directors of CaixaBank
Members of the American Philosophical Society